Michael Stewart (August 1, 1924 – September 20, 1987) was an American playwright and dramatist, librettist, lyricist, screenwriter and novelist.

Life and career
Born Myron Stuart Rubin in Manhattan, Stewart attended Queens College, and graduated from the Yale School of Drama with a Master of Fine Arts in 1953.

His early work was writing sketches for the revues The Shoestring Revue (1955), The Littlest Revue (1956), and Shoestring '57 (1956, Barbizon-Plaza, New York). He then joined the staff writers of Sid Caesar's television program, Caesar's Hour.

He met Charles Strouse and Lee Adams in 1954, and several years after collaborated with them and Gower Champion on the 1960 Broadway musical Bye Bye Birdie. He worked again with Champion and Jerry Herman, with their musical Hello, Dolly! opening on Broadway in 1964.

Stewart died on September 20, 1987 in New York City. Jule Styne said of him: "He was an extremely talented and knowledgeable man of the theater. He was one of the great musical-theater writers, and his string of hits showed that."  Stewart's sister was writer Francine Pascal and brother Burt Rubin.

Theatre credits
Bye Bye Birdie (1960) — musical — bookwriter — Tony Award for Best Musical
Carnival! (1961) — musical — bookwriter — Tony Nomination for Best Musical, Tony Nomination for Best Author of a Musical
Hello, Dolly! (1964) — musical — bookwriter — Tony Award for Best Musical, Tony Award for Best Author of a Musical
Those That Play the Clowns (1966) — play — playwright
George M! (1968) — musical — co-bookwriter with sister Francine Pascal and her husband John Pascal
Mack and Mabel (1974) — musical — bookwriter — Tony Nomination for Best Book of a Musical
I Love My Wife (1977) — musical — lyricist and bookwriter — Tony Nomination for Best Original Score, Tony Nomination for Best Book of a Musical
The Grand Tour (1979) — musical — co-bookwriter
Barnum (1980) — musical — lyricist — Tony Nomination for Best Original Score
42nd Street (1980) — musical — co-bookwriter — Tony Co-Nomination for Best Book of a Musical
Bring Back Birdie (1981) — musical — bookwriter
Pieces of Eight (1985) — music — co-bookwriter, Citadel Theatre in Edmonton, Canada and closed out of town.
Harrigan 'n Hart (1985) — musical — bookwriter — Tony Nomination for Best Book of a Musical

Notes

External links
 Internet Broadway Database
 
 Michael Stewart papers, 1948-1987, held by the Billy Rose Theatre Division, New York Public Library for the Performing Arts

Tony Award winners
American musical theatre librettists
American musical theatre lyricists
American male screenwriters
Broadway composers and lyricists
Yale School of Drama alumni
1924 births
1987 deaths
20th-century American dramatists and playwrights
American male dramatists and playwrights
20th-century American male writers
Screenwriters from New York (state)
20th-century American screenwriters